Sakamkam Fort is a historic fort in Sakamkam, just north of Fujairah City, Emirate of Fujairah, United Arab Emirates.

The fort, on a hilly position, became ruined, but has now been restored. It has a round watchtower, with views of the modern Fujairah City, where Fujairah Fort is located.

Sakamkam Fort is close to the Fujairah Free Zone, to the east.

See also
Other local forts:
 Al Bithnah Fort
 Fujairah Fort

References

Year of establishment missing
Forts in the United Arab Emirates
Buildings and structures in the Emirate of Fujairah
Fujairah City